Jayson Dénommée (born March 31, 1977, in Sherbrooke, Quebec) is a Canadian former competitive figure skater. He is the 1998 Ondrej Nepela Memorial silver medalist, 1999 Nebelhorn Trophy bronze medalist, and 2001 Canadian national silver medalist. He placed 11th at the 2001 and Four Continents Championships.

Programs

Results
GP: Champions Series / Grand Prix

Senior career

Junior and novice career

References

External links
 

1977 births
Canadian male single skaters
Living people
People from Val-des-Sources
Sportspeople from Sherbrooke